Golden Slumber is a 2018 South Korean action thriller film directed by Noh Dong-seok, starring Gang Dong-won, Kim Eui-sung, Kim Sung-kyun, Kim Dae-myung, Han Hyo-joo and Yoon Kye-sang. It is based on the 2007 Japanese novel of the same name written by Kōtarō Isaka, previously filmed by Yoshihiro Nakamura in 2010. The film revolves around a deliveryman who has to run for his life after he is held responsible for an explosion causing the death of a presidential candidate.

The film was released in South Korean theaters on 14 February 2018 and in US theaters on a limited basis, on 16 February 2018.

Plot
A presidential candidate is assassinated as part of a conspiracy, and a deliveryman has to flee for his life when he is framed and the evidence against him begins to accumulate.

Cast
Gang Dong-won as Kim Gun-woo 
A reliable and friendly package delivery worker who gains unexpected fame when he saves a pop star. However, his life changes when he is falsely accused of a terrorist attack that kills a presidential candidate. 
Kim Eui-sung as Mr. Min 
A mysterious man who helps Gun-woo after he is accused of being an assassin. 
Kim Sung-kyun as Geum-chul 
A computer repair man
Kim Dae-myung as Dong-gyu 
A band-mate and a close friend of Gun-woo from college, who is now a divorce lawyer.
Han Hyo-joo as Sun-young 
A radio reporter who went to college with Gun-woo and also his first love.
Yoon Kye-sang as Moo-yeol (special appearance) 
Gun-woo’s friend who is tasked with capturing him.

Lee Hang-na as Team leader Do
Park Hoon as Team leader Sun 
Kim Jae-young as Park Goon
Jo Young-jin as Yoo Young-gook 
Jung Jae-sung as Jo Se-hyun 
Jeong Hyeong-seok as Detective Cha
Ryu Hye-rin as Oyster woman
Baek Bong-ki as Courier competition man 
Lee Sang-hee as Geum Cheol-cheo
Yeom Hye-ran as Store middle-aged woman
Yoo Jae-myung as Hwang Jin-ho 
Lee Jun-hyeok as Plastic surgeon (cameo)
Jung So-min as Yoo-mi (cameo)
Choi Woo-shik as Joo-ho (cameo)
Kim Yoo-jung as Soo-ah (special appearance)
Namgoong Yeon as Radio DJ's voice (special appearance)
 Cha Soon-bae as Joint head of department

Release
On January 17, 2018 a press conference was held at Apgujeong CGV. The main cast together with the director were present at the event.

The main poster for the movie was revealed on January 19, 2018. It was followed by the main trailer being unveiled on February 1, 2018.

Golden Slumber was released on February 14, 2018 in South Korea.

The film was released internationally in the U.S, Taiwan, Hong Kong, India, Australia, New Zealand, Singapore, Malaysia, Brunei, Thailand, Cambodia and the Philippines.

Reception

Box office
In the first weekend of its release, Golden Slumber ranked third at the South Korean box office and sold 628,197 tickets. The film earned  during the first five days of its release. At the end of the second weekend, the movie suffered a 75% drop, grossing  by selling 158,217 tickets.

Critical responseLos Angeles Times noted, "The movie ultimately paints mass media cynicism as its real villain, noting how a sensationalist press and a gullible public allow amoral creeps to spread dangerous lies."Film Journal International recognised the film as "A fast-paced, Jason Bourne-like Korean thriller, given depth by its theme of friendship".National Post response for the film was "A confused but lively hour-and-three-quarters".Yonhap News Agency'' reviewed the movie to have "all the right ingredients to become a box office hit" however, "it appears to have lost balance when it tried to put in as many ingredients as possible."

References

External links

2018 films
South Korean action thriller films
South Korean chase films
2010s chase films
2018 action thriller films
Films based on Japanese novels
Films about friendship
CJ Entertainment films
2010s South Korean films